Valentyna Karpenko (born 9 December 1972) is a road cyclist from Ukraine. She represented her nation at the 2000 Summer Olympics and 2004 Summer Olympics She also rode at the 1995, 1999 and 2004 UCI Road World Championships.

References

External links
 profile at Cyclingarchives.com

Ukrainian female cyclists
Cyclists at the 2004 Summer Olympics
Cyclists at the 2000 Summer Olympics
Olympic cyclists of Ukraine
Living people
Place of birth missing (living people)
1972 births